Weston Hills may refer to:

Weston Hills, Lincolnshire, a hamlet in Lincolnshire, United Kingdom
Weston Hills, Baldock, a local nature reserve in Hertfordshire, United Kingdom
Weston Hills Tunnel, a road tunnel near the nature reserve
Weston Hill, a hill in Dorset, United Kingdom
Weston Hills Asylum, an asylum in the Nightmare on Elm Street franchise